James Young Gibson (19 February 1826 – 2 October 1886) was an essayist and translator noted for his work helping Alexander James Duffield translate Don Quixote into English in 1881, and on his own translations of Journey to Parnassus in 1883, Numantia in 1885 and El Cid in 1887.

Life
He was born in Edinburgh, the son of William Gibson, a merchant in the city.

He attended the University of Edinburgh from 1842 and then studied divinity with the United Presbyterian Church from 1847 to 1852. In his vacation 1851–1852 he studied at Halle University in Germany.

On his return he received a tutoring post with Henry Birkbeck's family at Keswick Hall whilst awaiting a post as a minister. In July 1853 he was ordained and took up a post in the United Presbyterian church in Melrose in the Scottish Borders. He held this role until his health broke down in 1859. He then took a long break in which he devoted himself to study and travelling, including a trip to Cairo and the Holy Land in 1865.

In 1871 he accompanied Alexander J. Duffield on a tour of iron mines in Spain. During this period Gibson developed a strong love of Spanish poetry, and began working on translations. In 1872 he returned to Britain, living in London. By 1878 he was again in poor health. During this period he worked on Duffield's translations of "Don Quixote", adding a more poetical edge to these. This was eventually published in 1881.

On 11 September 1883, rather late in life, he married Margaret Dunlop Smith, one of the "Westminster Sisters". The marriage took place in Wildbad in Germany. She was an intellectual and author having published "How the Codex was Found". From 1884 they lived in Long Ditton.

He died at Ramsgate but is buried in Dean Cemetery in Edinburgh near the north-east corner of the original cemetery. The bronze portrait on his monument is by Francis John Williamson.

Unpublished works and some of his memoirs were posthumously published by his wife, Margaret Dunlop Smith, with additional memoirs by her sister, Agnes Smith Lewis.

Published works
The Story of the Zulus
Miguel de Cervantes, Saavedra
Journey to Parnassus, composed by Cervantes
Numantia, a Tragedy by Cervantes
The Cid (El Cid) Ballads and other poems from Spanish and German

References

1826 births
1886 deaths
Writers from Edinburgh
Alumni of the University of Edinburgh
Burials at the Dean Cemetery
Scottish translators